Necropolis de San Carlos Borromeo also known as Cementerio de San Carlos or San Carlos Cemetery is located in Matanzas, Cuba. It was inaugurated on September 2, 1872 on 13.5 hectares.  It is the third most important Cemetery of Cuba in terms of patrimonial value, as much for its architecture, as for the personalities interred. His main architect was Francisco Sosa Vélez, who used Carrara marble, bronze and cast iron for the construction.

The San Carlos Cemetery came to solve the problem Matanzas had with the big number of cemeteries in the area, a figure higher than that of any other Cuban location.

The octagonal Chapel contains the remains of the martyrs of different wars of independence.  Its catacombs, currently the only ones active on the island, contain 756 niches in two underground pantheons and an exclusive system of ventilation against atmospheric pollution, similar to the Tobias Gallery, in the Colon Cemetery, Havana, in Havana.

Notable interments 
 Jose Jacinto Milanés (1814–1863), writer
 Joseph Marion Hernández (1793–1857), United States Congressman (interred in the del Junco family crypt
 Miguel Faílde (1852–1921), musician
 Fernando Heydrich  (1827–1903), engineer and sculptor, Builder of the Acueduct of Matanzas
 Bonifacio Byrne (1861–1936), poet
 Severiano Sainz y Bencamo (1871–1937), Catholic bishop
 Alfredo Nicasio Heydrich Martinez (1862–1933), one of the first producers of Sisal on the island

References

External links
 

Cemeteries in Cuba
Buildings and structures in Matanzas
1872 establishments in Cuba
19th-century architecture in Cuba